The United States Navy lists two ships that bore the name USS Pursuit.

  was purchased at New York on 3 September 1861 and was commissioned on 17 December 1861.
  was a U.S. Navy metal-hulled minesweeper commissioned 30 April 1943.

United States Navy ship names